Chomacha (also Romanized as Chomāchā; also known as Chamchā, Cheshmeh-ye Sar, Chomāchāh, Chumacha, Jir Maḩalleh Chamāchā, and Jīr Maḩalleh-ye Chamāchā) is a village in Jirdeh Rural District, in the Central District of Shaft County, Gilan Province, Iran. At the 2006 census, its population was 1,356, in 330 families.

References 

Populated places in Shaft County